Joseph Schubert (24 June 1890 – 4 April 1969) was a Romanian cleric and a titular bishop of the Roman Catholic Church.

Biography
Born to an ethnic German family in Bucharest, he studied theology at Innsbruck, becoming doctor of theology and being ordained a priest in 1916. After returning to Romania, he was assigned as parish priest in Caramurat, and in 1931 as a priest attached to the Bucharest cathedral. He also taught at the theological seminary in his native city. Following the 1949 arrest of Anton Durcovici by the authorities of the new Communist regime, he was made Apostolic Administrator of the Roman Catholic Archdiocese of Bucharest, being consecrated titular bishop of Ceramus by Gerald Patrick O'Hara in June 1950. Arrested in February 1951, he was sentenced to hard labor for life and freed in August 1964. Sighet prison was among the places where he was incarcerated. Forced to reside at first in Timişu de Sus, he was under constant surveillance from agents of the Religious Affairs Department. In January 1969 he was allowed to emigrate to Western Europe, meeting Pope Paul VI the following month and dying in Munich in April.

It was Schubert who consecrated Alexandru Todea bishop in 1950. Prior to leaving Romania, he transferred his administrative duties to Iosif Gonciu, who in turn left them to Ioan Robu in 1983.

See also

Notes

References
Mircea Birtz and Manfred Kierein, Alte fărâme din prescura prigoanei (1948-1989). Editura Napoca Star, Cluj-Napoca, 2010,

Further reading

 William Totok,
„Der vergessene stalinistische Schauprozess gegen die »Spione des Vatikans« in Rumänien 1951“, in: Jahrbuch für Historische Kommunismusforschung 2005, Hg. von Hermann Weber, Ulrich Mählert, Bernhard H. Bayerlein u.a., Aufbau Verlag, Berlin 2005, S. 233-259. 
„Der Bischof, Hitler und die Securitate. Der stalinistische Schauprozess gegen die so genannten »Spione des Vatikans«„, 1951 in Bukarest" (I-VII), in: Halbjahresschrift für südosteuropäosche Geschichte, Literatur und Politik, 17.-20. Jg. 2005-2008.
Episcopul, Hitler și Securitatea - Procesul stalinist împotriva »spionilor Vaticanului« din România, Editura Polirom, Iași, 2008.

1890 births
1969 deaths
Clergy from Bucharest
Romanian people of German descent
20th-century Roman Catholic titular bishops
Romanian anti-communist clergy
Romanian prisoners and detainees
People detained by the Securitate
Inmates of Sighet prison
20th-century Roman Catholic bishops in Romania